Christopher James Mepham (born 5 November 1997) is a Welsh professional footballer who plays as a centre back for  club AFC Bournemouth and the Wales national team. He is a product of the Brentford and Chelsea academies.

Club career

Early years
A centre back and occasional right back, Mepham began his career in the academy at Premier League club Chelsea at the age of 10. He was released at the age of 14 and was then turned down by Watford and Queens Park Rangers.

Brentford

Youth years (2012–2016)
Mepham joined the academy at Brentford in 2012, after being spotted by the club's Head of Academy Recruitment while making a one-off appearance for North Greenford United's reserve team. After making three appearances for the youth team as an U16, Mepham signed a scholarship deal in June 2014. On 2 February 2016 it was announced that Mepham had signed his first professional contract to be a member of the club's development squad and he finished his scholarship having made 43 appearances and scored two goals for the youth team. After consistently good performances for the reformed B team during the first half of the 2016–17 season, Mepham signed a two-year contract extension on 6 January 2017 and the following day, he made his senior debut as a late substitute for Harlee Dean during a 5–1 FA Cup third round victory over Eastleigh. A successful 2016–17 season saw Mepham named as the club's B Team Player of the Year.

Breakthrough (2016–2019)
After the departure of centre-back Harlee Dean on 30 August 2017, Mepham was promoted into the first team squad and signed a new five-year contract. He made his first start for the club in a 3–1 EFL Cup third round defeat to Norwich City on 19 September 2017 and gave away the penalty which led to the Canaries' opening goal. After appearing sporadically throughout the autumn, a head injury suffered by John Egan in December allowed Mepham a run in the team from the Christmas period until early February 2018. An achilles injury suffered by Andreas Bjelland in mid-March allowed Mepham back into the team and he scored the first senior goal of his career with the equaliser in a 1–1 draw with Sheffield United on Good Friday. He finished the 2017–18 season with 23 appearances and one goal.

Mepham began the 2018–19 season as the Bees' undisputed first-choice centre back in league matches, but was sent off for the first time in his career for two bookable offences committed during a 1–0 defeat to Bristol City on 20 October 2018. He made 27 appearances before departing the club for a club-record transfer fee in January 2019. During his two-and-a-half seasons as a professional at Griffin Park, Mepham made 48 appearances and scored one goal.

AFC Bournemouth
On 22 January 2019, Mepham signed a long-term contract with Premier League club AFC Bournemouth for an undisclosed fee, reported to be £12 million. Eight days later, he made his debut for the club as a substitute for Junior Stanislas late in a 4–0 win over Chelsea. He continued to be regularly selected within the back line at Bournemouth due to the absence of Steve Cook through injury. Mepham finished the 2018–19 season with Bournemouth having made 13 Premier League appearances in total.

On 10 August 2019, Mepham scored his first Premier League goal, and his first ever goal for the Cherries, in a 1–1 home draw against newly promoted Sheffield United. Mepham made a further ten appearances in the Premier League for the Cherries throughout the first half of the 2019–20 season, including a starring role in a 1–0 away win and clean sheet at Chelsea on 14 December. However, Mepham would suffer a "significant knee injury" in the FA Cup game against Luton Town on 4 January, which would potentially rule him out for up to three months.

International career

Mepham was called into the Wales U20 squad for the 2017 Toulon Tournament and made one appearance, in a 2–2 group stage draw with Ivory Coast on 5 June 2017. He made his U21 debut with a start in a 3–0 2019 UEFA U21 Championship qualifying victory over Switzerland on 2 September 2017. Mepham captained the U21 team for the first time in a 0–0 qualifying draw with Romania six weeks later.

In March 2018, Mepham won his maiden call-up to the senior team for the 2018 China Cup. He made his debut as a substitute for Ben Davies after 70 minutes of a 6–0 victory over China on 22 March 2018. Two months later, he made his first international start, in a 0–0 friendly draw with Mexico on 28 May.

In May 2021, he was selected for the Wales squad for the delayed UEFA Euro 2020 tournament. In November 2022, he was named in the Wales squad for the 2022 FIFA World Cup in Qatar.

Personal life
Mepham was born in Northwick Park, the London Borough of Harrow. He attended Queensmead School in South Ruislip and grew up as a Queens Park Rangers supporter. His uncle Roy was a member of the Brentford youth team in the 1960s.

Career statistics

Club

International

Honours
AFC Bournemouth
Championship runner-up: 2021–22

Individual
Brentford B Player of the Year: 2016–17

Notes

References

External links

Profile at the AFC Bournemouth website

1997 births
Living people
Footballers from Hammersmith
English footballers
Welsh footballers
Wales youth international footballers
Wales under-21 international footballers
Wales international footballers
Association football defenders
Brentford F.C. players
AFC Bournemouth players
English Football League players
Premier League players
UEFA Euro 2020 players
2022 FIFA World Cup players